Abu al-Abbas Abdallah I ibn Ibrahim I ibn al-Aghlabi was the second Aghlabid emir of Ifriqiya, ruling from October/November 812 to his death on 25 June 817. 

He was known for his beauty, but also for his arbitrary rule, as he introduced a tax on crops in cash, instead of the usual tithe in kind. This tax was contrary to Quranic precedent and aroused much opposition. When Abdallah died shortly after, it was widely considered as a divine punishment. 

He was succeeded by his brother Ziyadat Allah I.

References

Sources
 

8th-century births
817 deaths
Aghlabid emirs of Ifriqiya